Judy is the debut studio album of American country music artist. Judy Rodman. It was released by MTM Records in 1986. The album contained five singles that were released between 1985 and 1986, including the number one hit "Until I Met You."

Background
After signing with MTM Records in 1985, Rodman released her first three singles between 1985 and 1986. It wasn't until 1986, when Rodman's fourth single, "Until I Met You" became a major hit (reaching #1 on the Hot Country Songs chart) that MTM released this debut album. It contains the four singles issued by Rodman between 1985 and 1986, including "Until I Met You." In addition, a fifth single was spawned from the album, "She Thinks That's She'll Marry", which placed in the Country Top 10 in 1987. "Come Next Monday" was later a Number One hit in 1990 for K.T. Oslin, who co-wrote it.

The album received a positive review from Allmusic, giving the album four out of five stars.
Judy peaked at #23 on Top Country Albums chart after it release in 1986; it was her highest-peaking album on that chart.

Track listing

Chart performance

Album

Singles

References

1986 debut albums
Judy Rodman albums
MTM Records albums